The 1938 elections to select inductees to the Baseball Hall of Fame were conducted along much the same lines as the 1937 vote. Toward the goal of 10 initial inductees from the 20th century, eight had now been selected; members of the Baseball Writers' Association of America (BBWAA) were once again given authority to select any players active in the 20th century, excepting active players. The Centennial Commission retained the responsibility of selecting inductees whose contributions were largely as non-players.

As the obvious stars had already been elected, only pitcher Grover Cleveland Alexander was selected via the BBWAA ballot. The Centennial Commission selected Alexander Cartwright and Henry Chadwick.

BBWAA vote
In the BBWAA election, voters were instructed to cast votes for 10 candidates. Any candidate receiving votes on at least 75% of the ballots would be honored with induction to the Hall upon its opening in the sport's supposed centennial year of 1939. Individuals who had been barred from baseball, though not formally ineligible, no longer received even the minimal support given them in the two prior elections.

A total of 262 ballots were cast, with 2,475 individual votes for 120 specific candidates, an average of 9.45 per ballot; 197 votes were required for election. The balloting was dominated by players of the 1900s and 1910s, rather than those of the more recent two decades; the results were announced in January 1938. The sole candidate who received at least 75% of the vote and was elected is indicated in bold italics; candidates who have since been selected in subsequent elections are indicated in italics:

Centennial Commission
Once again, the Hall opted to have this small committee of six members select inductees "for outstanding service to base ball apart from playing the game." After selecting five individuals in 1937, the Commission chose two inductees at the major league winter meetings in New York City in December 1938, though the choices were not announced until the following month:

Alexander Cartwright, who had been instrumental in organizing some of the game's first teams in the 1840s and had moved to establish the game's first consistent playing rules; and
Henry Chadwick, a sportswriter who had tirelessly promoted the game in the late 19th century and had been a major force in revision of the rules through several decades. To date he is the only sportswriter (or commentator) to be inducted into the real Hall of Fame (as opposed to the writers' and commentators' "wings").

References

External links
1938 Election at www.baseballhalloffame

Baseball Hall of Fame balloting
1938 in baseball